The 2007 Czech and Slovak Figure Skating Championships were held at the TipSport Arena in Liberec, Czech Republic on December 14–15, 2006. Skaters competed in the disciplines of men's singles, ladies' singles, pair skating, and ice dancing on the senior, junior, and novice levels.

The two national championships were held simultaneously and the results were then split by country. The top three skaters from each country formed their national podiums. Therefore, there are no medal colors on the table below because it shows the combined overall results. The table can be sorted by country. This was the first season that the Czech and Slovak Championships were held simultaneously.

The senior compulsory dance was the Golden Waltz and the junior compulsory dance was the Midnight Blues. The first novice compulsory dance was the American Waltz and the second was the Kilian.

Medals summary

Czech Republic

Slovakia

Senior results

Men

Ladies

Ice dancing

Junior results

Men

Ladies

Pairs

Ice dancing

Novice results

Ice dancing

External links
 2007 Czech and Slovak Championships results

2006 in figure skating
Czech And Slovak Figure Skating Championships, 2007
Czech Figure Skating Championships
Slovak Figure Skating Championships
Czech Republic–Slovakia relations
2007 in Slovak sport
2007 in Czech sport